Proadamas is a genus of moth in the family Gelechiidae. It contains the species Proadamas indefessa, which is found in Sri Lanka.

The wingspan is about 11 mm. The forewings are fuscous irrorated dark fuscous with vein 1b and the margins of the cell marked with whitish lines, the latter limiting obscure darker spots at one-third and two-thirds of the wing representing the discal stigmata. The costal edge is marked with a white dash before the middle and a small subtriangular spot towards the apex. There is also a small round dark fuscous apical spot. The hindwings are light grey, towards the base subhyaline speckled grey and with a small whitish-ochreous tuft from the base on the dorsal edge.

References

Gelechiinae